Orbiniidae is a family of polychaete worms. Orbiniids are mostly unselective deposit feeders on marine detritus. They can be found from the neritic zone to abyssal depths.

The family was revised in 1957 by Hartman  and some further revisions were made by Blake in 2000.

Genera

Alcandra
Aricia Savigny, 1820
Berkeleyia
Branchethus
Califia
Clytie
Falklandiella
Labotas
Lacydes
Leitoscoloplos Day, 1977
Leodamas
Microrbinia Hartman, 1965
Naidonereis
Nainereis Blainville, 1828
Naineris Blainville, 1828
Orbinella
Orbinia Quatrefages, 1865
Orbiniella Day, 1954
Paraorbiniella Rullier, 1974
Pararicia
Pettibonella
Phylo Kinberg, 1865
Phylodamas
Porcia
Proscoloplos
Protoaricia Czerniavsky, 1881
Protoariciella Hartmann-Schroder, 1962
Schroederella Laubier, 1962
Scolaricia
Scoloplella Day, 1963
Scoloplos Blainville, 1828
Scoloplosia
Theodisca
Uncorbinia
Uschakovius Laubier, 1973

References

Polychaetes